Hugo Siegmüller (30 October 1889 – 24 June 1958) was a Sudeten German painter. His work, representing Czechoslovakia, was part of the painting event in the art competition at the 1932 Summer Olympics and  the art competition of the 1936 Summer Olympics.

References

1889 births
1958 deaths
Czechoslovak painters
People from Děčín District
Sudeten German people